Meadow Lake 105C is an Indian reserve of the Flying Dust First Nation in Saskatchewan. It is Lots 12, 13, and 14, Block 14, northeast quarter of Section 26, Township 59, Range 17, west of the Third Meridian.

References

Indian reserves in Saskatchewan
Division No. 17, Saskatchewan